Aluminium molybdate is the chemical compound Al2(MoO4)3. The room temperature crystal structure was refined using time-of-flight powder neutron diffraction data. It is monoclinic and isostructural with Fe2(MoO4)3 and Cr2(MoO4)3.

References

External links
 Aluminum Molybdate MSDS

Molybdates
Aluminium compounds